The Florence Hummerston Kiosk is a building located at Elizabeth Quay in Perth, Western Australia. The kiosk was originally located on the Perth Esplanade, until being relocated to the foreshore of the Swan River. The kiosk is also known as The Esplanade Kiosk

Site and brief
The kiosk was built on reclaimed land on the Esplanade Reserve and replaced a grandstand that had been built in 1885. The building was constructed in 1928 as a tearoom and changing room for the adjoining sporting facilities. The kiosk was located on the northern side of the reserve on Bazar Terrace (later renamed The Esplanade).

Architecture
It was designed by Louis Bowser Cumpston in what was described by its heritage assessment as "a fine example of the Federation Arts and Crafts style, composed of interlocking octagonal forms with elliptical arched windows".

Construction
The building was approved in mid-1928 and building was completed for a December 1928 opening. It was built for a cost of A£5,991, about AU$ today.

Later uses
It has been altered at times by the Perth City Council.

Over time it has also been known as, Esplanade Tearooms for most of the 1940s and 1950s, Annabella's Nightclub (1977–1980), Florence Hummerston Day Care Centre (1985–1998) after former City Counselor Florence Hummerston, as well as the Salvation Army youth drop-in centre The Converted Duke (1982–1985), and has had other usages as well.

With the redevelopment of Esplanade Reserve in the early 1970s, the change rooms and public toilets were redesigned internally.

Relocation
Plans for the 2012 redevelopment of the Esplanade area included dismantling the original building and moving it elsewhere. The newer additions (with lesser heritage values) would be demolished.

In November 2012, the Western Australian government confirmed the kiosk would be reconstructed in an island at the centre of the Elizabeth Quay project. In March 2015 the government confirmed the relocation had cost A$11 million. The cost included a A$7 million compensation payout to the operator of a Chinese restaurant who had a 44-year lease on the building.

References

External links
 
 Florence Hummerston Kiosk
 Isle of Voyage

1928 establishments in Australia
Perth waterfront
Buildings and structures in Perth, Western Australia
Federation style architecture
State Register of Heritage Places in the City of Perth
Relocated buildings and structures in Australia